Spencer Ford (born April 20, 1976) is a professional lacrosse player who played in the Major League Lacrosse for the Baltimore/Washington Bayhawks, Los Angeles Riptide, and the Rochester Rattlers. He then went into coaching and management before being named the head coach of the Philadelphia Barrage in 2020.

College career
Ford attended Towson University, where as a senior in 1999, he recorded 53 assists for a nation's leading 4.08 assists per game, ranking  tenth all-time in NCAA Division I lacrosse.  On March 20, 1999 he recorded 13 points (5 goals & 8 assists), which is the second highest points per game by an individual.  While at Towson, he was named to the All-Conference team three times.

Professional career
Ford began his pro lacrosse career in 2001 with the Baltimore Bayhawks, appearing in one game. He did not appear in another game until the 2006 MLL season, when Ford joined the Rochester Rattlers for a single game before being picked up by the Riptide for the remainder of the season.  The 2007 season was a break-out season for Ford.  He was named as Offensive Player of the Week on July 30, named to the 2007 All-Star Game, and broke Conor Gill's league assist record (40) with a 47 assist season.  After the season, he was awarded with the Major League Lacrosse Most Improved Player of the Year Award.

Statistics

MLL

References

1976 births
Living people
Towson Tigers men's lacrosse players
Major League Lacrosse players
American lacrosse players
Major League Lacrosse major award winners